The 2013–14 Dallas Mavericks season was the 34th season of the franchise in the National Basketball Association (NBA).

After a one-year absence, the Mavericks qualified for the playoffs and pushed the San Antonio Spurs to seven games in the first round despite being swept in the regular season for the second consecutive year, four games to zero. The Mavs were up 2-1 following Vince Carter's buzzer in Game 3 before losing the final game to the eventual champion on the road.

Key dates
 May 21, 2013: The NBA draft Lottery took place.
 June 27, 2013: The 2013 NBA draft took place at the Barclays Center in Brooklyn, New York.
 July 1, 2013: The NBA free agency period began.

Draft picks

On Draft night, the Mavs sent Kelly Olynyk to the Celtics in exchange for Lucas Nogueira and 2-second round picks. The Mavericks subsequently traded Nogueira, Jared Cunningham and Mike Muscala to the Atlanta Hawks for Shane Larkin. They then traded for guard Ricky Ledo with the second round pick they received from Boston.

Offseason

The Mavericks declined to offer Darren Collison a qualifying offer on June 30, making him an unrestricted free agent.

Israeli point guard Gal Mekel verbally agreed to a 3-year deal with the Mavericks on July 1.

On July 6, the Mavericks reportedly agreed to sign point guard José Calderón to a 4-year, $28 million contract. They then agreed to sign former Maverick Devin Harris to a 3-year, $9 million contract, but it was later scrapped due to Harris' toe injury. The signing of Harris was made official on July 31.

Shooting guard Wayne Ellington reportedly agreed to a 2-year deal worth $5 million with the Mavericks on July 10.

On July 12, the Mavericks have struck a 3-year deal worth at least $25 million with shooting guard Monta Ellis.

Center Samuel Dalembert reportedly agreed to sign with the Mavericks on July 18.

Bernard James and Josh Akognon were waived on July 21 but James was re-signed on July 26 after he cleared waivers.

Nick Calathes was traded to Memphis on July 22 for a 2016 second-round draft pick.

Draft picks Ricky Ledo and Shane Larkin were signed on July 24 and 29 respectively.

On July 25, the Mavericks re-signed forward-center Brandan Wright to a 2-year, $10 million deal.

The Mavericks signed DeJuan Blair officially on August 7.

The preseason schedule was released on August 15.

Roster

Pre-season

|-bgcolor=ffcccc
| 1
| October 7
| New Orleans
| 
| Brandan Wright (14)
| four players (5)
| Monta Ellis (7)
| American Airlines Center15,082
| 0–1
|-bgcolor=ccffcc
| 2
| October 9
| @ Memphis
| 
| Dirk Nowitzki (20)
| Samuel Dalembert (7)
| Monta Ellis (8)
| FedExForum11,459
| 1–1
|-bgcolor=ffcccc
| 3
| October 14
| Orlando
| 
| Dirk Nowitzki (24)
| Samuel Dalembert (8)
| Gal Mekel (6)
| American Airlines Center17,136
| 1–2
|-bgcolor=ccffcc
| 4
| October 16
| @ Indiana
| 
| Shawn Marion (18)
| Shawn Marion (11)
| Monta Ellis (9)
| Bankers Life Fieldhouse12,735
| 2–2
|-bgcolor=ccffcc
| 5
| October 19
| @ Charlotte
| 
| three players (13)
| Shawn Marion (8)
| Gal Mekel (6)
| Greensboro Coliseum7,678
| 3–2
|-bgcolor=ffcccc
| 6
| October 21
| @ Houston
| 
| José Calderón (14)
| Samuel Dalembert (7)
| Monta Ellis (7)
| Toyota Center13,380
| 3–3
|-bgcolor=ccffcc
| 7
| October 23
| Atlanta
| 
| Dirk Nowitzki (17)
| Samuel Dalembert (11)
| Gal Mekel (7)
| American Airlines Center16,160
| 4–3
|-bgcolor=ffcccc
| 8
| October 25
| Indiana
| 
| Dirk Nowitzki (14)
| Samuel Dalembert (9)
| Monta Ellis (6)
| American Airlines Center19,107
| 4–4
|-

Regular season

Standings

Game log

|-bgcolor=ccffcc
| 1
| October 30
| Atlanta
| 
| Monta Ellis (32)
| Samuel Dalembert (9)
| José Calderón (11)
| American Airlines Center19,834
| 1–0
|-

|-bgcolor=ffcccc
| 2
| November 1
| @ Houston
| 
| Dirk Nowitzki (22)
| DeJuan BlairShawn Marion(10)
| José CalderónGal Mekel(6)
| Toyota Center18,142
| 1–1
|-bgcolor=ccffcc
| 3
| November 2
| Memphis
| 
| Dirk Nowitzki (24)
| Shawn Marion (14)
| José Calderón (5)
| American Airlines Center20,262
| 2–1
|-bgcolor=ccffcc
| 4
| November 5
| LA Lakers
| 
| Monta Ellis (30)
| DeJuan BlairDirk Nowitzki(8)
| Monta Ellis (9)
| American Airlines Center19,670
| 3–1
|-bgcolor=ffcccc
| 5
| November 6
| @ Oklahoma City
| 
| Monta Ellis (20)
| Samuel Dalembert (9)
| four players (3)
| Chesapeake Energy Arena18,203
| 3–2
|-bgcolor=ffcccc
| 6
| November 8
| @ Minnesota
| 
| Monta Ellis (23)
| DeJuan Blair (9)
| José Calderón (7)
| Target Center13,677
| 3–3
|-bgcolor=ccffcc
| 7
| November 9
| @ Milwaukee
| 
| Monta Ellis (18)
| DeJuan Blair (11)
| Monta Ellis (5)
| BMO Harris Bradley Center16,448
| 4–3
|-bgcolor=ccffcc
| 8
| November 12
| Washington
| 
| Monta EllisDirk Nowitzki(19)
| DeJuan Blair (11)
| Monta Ellis (7)
| American Airlines Center19,627
| 5–3
|-bgcolor=ffcccc
| 9
| November 15
| @ Miami
| 
| Dirk Nowitzki (28)
| Samuel Dalembert (9)
| DeJuan BlairJosé Calderón(5)
| American Airlines Arena19,772
| 5–4
|-bgcolor=ccffcc
| 10
| November 16
| @ Orlando
| 
| Monta Ellis (19)
| Shawn Marion (8)
| José Calderón (9)
| Amway Center15,039
| 6–4
|-bgcolor=ccffcc
| 11
| November 18
| Philadelphia
| 
| Monta Ellis (24)
| Samuel Dalembert (14)
| Monta Ellis (10)
| American Airlines Center19,790
| 7–4
|-bgcolor=ccffcc
| 12
| November 20
| Houston
| 
| Monta Ellis (37)
| Samuel Dalembert (10)
| Monta Ellis (8)
| American Airlines Center20,045
| 8–4
|-bgcolor=ccffcc
| 13
| November 22
| Utah
| 
| Monta Ellis (26)
| Samuel Dalembert (12)
| Monta Ellis (6)
| American Airlines Center19,781
| 9–4
|-bgcolor=ffcccc
| 14
| November 23
| @ Denver
| 
| Dirk Nowitzki (27)
| DeJuan Blair (10)
| José Calderón (5)
| Pepsi Center17,841
| 9–5
|-bgcolor=ffcccc
| 15
| November 25
| Denver
| 
| Monta Ellis (22)
| Shawn Marion (12)
| three players (4)
| American Airlines Center19,677
| 9–6
|-bgcolor=ccffcc
| 16
| November 27
| Golden State
| 
| Dirk Nowitzki (22)
| DeJuan Blair (9)
| Monta Ellis (10)
| American Airlines Center20,211
| 10–6
|-bgcolor=ffcccc
| 17
| November 29
| @ Atlanta
| 
| José CalderónDirk Nowitzki(16)
| DeJuan Blair (18)
| Vince CarterMonta Ellis(4)
| Philips Arena15,463
| 10–7
|-bgcolor=ffcccc
| 18
| November 30
| Minnesota
| 
| Monta Ellis (26)
| DeJuan Blair (8)
| Gal Mekel (7)
| American Airlines Center20,173
| 10–8
|-

|-bgcolor=ccffcc
| 19
| December 3
| Charlotte
| 
| Dirk Nowitzki (25)
| Shawn Marion (10)
| Monta Ellis (5)
| American Airlines Center19,612
| 11–8
|-bgcolor=ccffcc
| 20
| December 4
| @ New Orleans
| 
| Dirk Nowitzki (21)
| Samuel DalembertDirk Nowitzki(7)
| Monta Ellis (10)
| New Orleans Arena14,524
| 12–8
|-bgcolor=ccffcc
| 21
| December 7
| @ Portland
| 
| Dirk Nowitzki (28)
| DeJuan Blair (8)
| José CalderónDirk Nowitzki(7)
| Rose Garden20,142
| 13–8
|-bgcolor=ffcccc
| 22
| December 9
| @ Sacramento
| 
| Monta Ellis (21)
| Jae Crowder (7)
| Dirk Nowitzki (7)
| Sleep Train Arena15,329
| 13–9
|-bgcolor=ffcccc
| 23
| December 11
| @ Golden State
| 
| Monta EllisDirk Nowitzki(21)
| DeJuan BlairShawn Marion(9)
| José CalderónMonta Ellis(5)
| Oracle Arena19,596
| 13–10
|-bgcolor=ccffcc
| 24
| December 14
| Milwaukee
| 
| Brandan Wright (19)
| Shawn Marion (12)
| Vince Carter (9)
| American Airlines Center19,973
| 14–10
|-bgcolor=ccffcc
| 25
| December 18
| Memphis
| 
| Dirk Nowitzki (20)
| Samuel DalembertShawn Marion(7)
| Vince Carter (6)
| American Airlines Center19,425
| 15–10
|-bgcolor=ffcccc
| 26
| December 20
| Toronto
| 
| José Calderón (23)
| Shawn MarionDirk Nowitzki(9)
| Monta Ellis (11)
| American Airlines Center19,406
| 15–11
|-bgcolor=ffcccc
| 27
| December 21
| @ Phoenix
| 
| Dirk Nowitzki (21)
| three players (6)
| Monta Ellis (9)
| US Airways Center15,241
| 15–12
|-bgcolor=ccffcc
| 28
| December 23
| @ Houston
| 
| Dirk Nowitzki (31)
| Samuel Dalembert (7)
| José CalderónMonta Ellis(5)
| Toyota Center18,328
| 16–12
|-bgcolor=ffcccc
| 29
| December 26
| San Antonio
| 
| Dirk Nowitzki (25)
| DeJuan Blair (11)
| Monta Ellis (6)
| American Airlines Center20,305
| 16–13
|-bgcolor=ccffcc
| 30
| December 28
| @ Chicago
| 
| Monta Ellis (22)
| Shawn Marion (13)
| José Calderón (7)
| United Center22,099
| 17–13
|-bgcolor=ccffcc
| 31
| December 30
| @ Minnesota
| 
| Shawn Marion (32)
| Samuel Dalembert (7)
| Monta Ellis (10)
| Target Center16,111
| 18–13
|-

|-bgcolor=ccffcc
| 32
| January 1
| @ Washington
| 
| Monta Ellis (23)
| Shawn Marion (9)
| Shawn MarionDirk Nowitzki(4)
| Verizon Center15,713
| 19–13
|-bgcolor=ffcccc
| 33
| January 3
| LA Clippers
| 
| Dirk Nowitzki (24)
| DeJuan BlairShawn Marion(6)
| Monta Ellis (9)
| American Airlines Center20,187
| 19–14
|-bgcolor=ffcccc
| 34
| January 5
| New York
| 
| Dirk Nowitzki (18)
| Dirk Nowitzki (9)
| José Calderón (6)
| American Airlines Center19,892
| 19–15
|-bgcolor=ccffcc
| 35
| January 7
| LA Lakers
| 
| Dirk Nowitzki (27)
| DeJuan Blair (9)
| Monta Ellis (9)
| American Airlines Center19,656
| 20–15
|-bgcolor=ffcccc
| 36
| January 8
| @ San Antonio
| 
| Monta Ellis (21)
| DeJuan Blair (6)
| Gal Mekel (5)
| AT&T Center18,581
| 20–16
|-bgcolor=ccffcc
| 37
| January 10
| @ New Orleans
| 
| Dirk Nowitzki (24)
| Samuel Dalembert (8)
| Monta Ellis (8)
| New Orleans Arena16,533
| 21–16
|-bgcolor=ccffcc
| 38
| January 11
| New Orleans
| 
| Dirk Nowitzki (40)
| Samuel Dalembert (9)
| José Calderón (5)
| American Airlines Center20,116
| 22–16
|-bgcolor=ccffcc
| 39
| January 13
| Orlando
| 
| Monta Ellis (21)
| DeJuan Blair (7)
| Gal Mekel (7)
| American Airlines Center 19,695
| 23–16
|-bgcolor=ffcccc
| 40
| January 15
| @ LA Clippers
| 
| Dirk Nowitzki (27)
| Dirk Nowitzki (8)
| Monta Ellis (13)
| Staples Center 19,695
| 23–17
|-bgcolor=ccffcc
| 41
| January 17
| @ Phoenix
| 
| Monta Ellis (24)
| three players (7)
| Monta Ellis (7)
| US Airways Center16,486
| 24–17
|-bgcolor=ffcccc
| 42
| January 18
| Portland
| 
| Dirk Nowitzki (18)
| Samuel Dalembert (6)
| Shane Larkin (4)
| American Airlines Center20,375
| 24–18
|-bgcolor=ccffcc
| 43
| January 20
| @ Cleveland
| 
| Monta Ellis (22)
| Dirk Nowitzki (10)
| Monta Ellis (8)
| Quicken Loans Arena18,762
| 25–18
|-bgcolor=ffcccc
| 44
| January 22
| @ Toronto
| 
| Monta Ellis (21)
| DeJuan BlairSamuel Dalembert(7)
| Monta Ellis (6)
| Air Canada Centre18,179
| 25–19
|-bgcolor=ffcccc
| 45
| January 24
| @ Brooklyn
| 
| Vince Carter (19)
| Shawn Marion (11)
| Monta Ellis (7)
| Barclays Center16,110
| 25–20
|-bgcolor=ccffcc
| 46
| January 26
| Detroit
| 
| Dirk Nowitzki (28)
| Dirk Nowitzki (9)
| Devin Harris (7)
| American Airlines Center19,662
| 26–20
|-bgcolor=ffcccc
| 47
| January 29
| Houston
| 
| Dirk Nowitzki (38)
| Dirk Nowitzki (17)
| José CalderónMonta Ellis(5)
| American Airlines Center19,359
| 26–21
|-bgcolor=ccffcc
| 48
| January 31
| Sacramento
| 
| Dirk Nowitzki (34)
| Brandan Wright (10)
| José Calderón (7)
| American Airlines Center19,614
| 27–21
|-

|-bgcolor=ccffcc
| 49
| February 3
| Cleveland
| 
| Dirk Nowitzki (23)
| Samuel DalembertDirk Nowitzki(8)
| José Calderón (10)
| American Airlines Center19,595
| 28–21
|-bgcolor=ccffcc
| 50
| February 5
| @ Memphis
| 
| Dirk Nowitzki (26)
| Samuel Dalembert (10)
| Vince Carter (7)
| FedExForum16,188
| 29–21
|-bgcolor=ccffcc
| 51
| February 7
| Utah
| 
| Monta Ellis (22)
| Vince Carter (8)
| José Calderón (7)
| American Airlines Center19,928
| 30–21
|-bgcolor=ccffcc
| 52
| February 9
| @ Boston
| 
| Dirk Nowitzki (20)
| Samuel Dalembert (11)
| Devin Harris (7)
| TD Garden17,650
| 31–21
|-bgcolor=ffcccc
| 53
| February 11
| @ Charlotte
| 
| Monta EllisDirk Nowitzki(16)
| Samuel Dalembert (6)
| Monta Ellis (7)
| Time Warner Cable Arena11,467
| 31–22
|-bgcolor=ccffcc
| 54
| February 12
| @ Indiana
| 
| Monta Ellis (23)
| Monta Ellis (9)
| Monta Ellis (6)
| Bankers Life Fieldhouse17,663
| 32–22
|- align="center"
|colspan="9" bgcolor="#bbcaff"|All-Star Break
|-bgcolor=ffcccc
| 55
| February 18
| Miami
| 
| Dirk Nowitzki (22)
| Samuel DalembertDirk Nowitzki(9)
| Dirk Nowitzki (7)
| American Airlines Center20,461
| 32–23
|-bgcolor=ccffcc
| 56
| February 21
| @ Philadelphia
| 
| Dirk Nowitzki (25)
| Vince Carter (9)
| José Calderón (10)
| Wells Fargo Center14,928
| 33–23
|-bgcolor=ccffcc
| 57
| February 22
| @ Detroit
| 
| Dirk Nowitzki (24)
| Samuel DalembertShawn Marion(11)
| Monta Ellis (13)
| The Palace of Auburn Hills15,213
| 34–23
|-bgcolor=ccffcc
| 58
| February 24
| @ New York
| 
| Vince Carter (23)
| Samuel Dalembert (10)
| Devin Harris (8)
| Madison Square Garden19,812
| 35–23
|-bgcolor=ccffcc
| 59
| February 26
| New Orleans
| 
| Monta Ellis (23)
| Shawn MarionBrandan Wright(11)
| Monta Ellis (7)
| American Airlines Center19,729
| 36–23
|-bgcolor=ffcccc
| 60
| February 28
| Chicago
| 
| Monta Ellis (20)
| Samuel Dalembert (10)
| Monta Ellis (5)
| American Airlines Center20,398
| 36–24
|-

|-bgcolor=ffcccc
| 61
| March 2
| @ San Antonio
| 
| Dirk Nowitzki (22)
| Samuel Dalembert (10)
| Monta Ellis (8)
| AT&T Center18,581
| 36–25
|-bgcolor=ffcccc
| 62
| March 5
| @ Denver
| 
| Dirk Nowitzki (27)
| Dirk Nowitzki (7)
| Devin Harris (11)
| Pepsi Center14,541
| 36–26
|-bgcolor=ccffcc
| 63
| March 7
| Portland
| 
| Dirk Nowitzki (22)
| Samuel DalembertMonta Ellis(8)
| Monta Ellis (7)
| American Airlines Center20,251
| 37–26
|-bgcolor=ccffcc
| 64
| March 9
| Indiana
| 
| Monta EllisDevin Harris(20)
| three players (8)
| José Calderón (7)
| American Airlines Center20,361
| 38–26
|-bgcolor=ffcccc
| 65
| March 11
| @ Golden State
| 
| Monta Ellis (15)
| DeJuan Blair (8)
| José Calderón (5)
| Oracle Arena19,596
| 38–27
|-bgcolor=ccffcc
| 66
| March 12
| @ Utah
| 
| Dirk Nowitzki (31)
| Dirk Nowitzki (8)
| Monta Ellis (11)
| EnergySolutions Arena17,982
| 39–27
|-bgcolor=ccffcc
| 67
| March 16
| @ Oklahoma City
| 
| Shawn Marion (19)
| Brandan Wright (8)
| José CalderónMonta Ellis(7)
| Chesapeake Energy Arena18,203
| 40–27
|-bgcolor=ccffcc
| 68
| March 17
| Boston
| 
| Dirk Nowitzki (19)
| Samuel DalembertMonta Ellis(7)
| José CalderónDevin Harris(6)
| American Airlines Center20,132
| 41–27
|-bgcolor=ffcccc
| 69
| March 19
| Minnesota
| 
| Dirk Nowitzki (27)
| Samuel Dalembert (14)
| Shawn Marion (5)
| American Airlines Center20,100
| 41–28
|-bgcolor=ccffcc
| 70
| March 21
| Denver
| 
| Monta Ellis (26)
| Samuel Dalembert (10)
| Monta Ellis (7)
| American Airlines Center20,188
| 42–28
|-bgcolor=ffcccc
| 71
| March 23
| Brooklyn
| 
| Monta Ellis (32)
| Samuel Dalembert (15)
| Devin Harris (6)
| American Airlines Center19,603
| 42–29
|-bgcolor=ccffcc
| 72
| March 25
| Oklahoma City
| 
| Dirk Nowitzki (32)
| Dirk Nowitzki (10)
| José Calderón (8)
| American Airlines Center19,607
| 43–29
|-bgcolor=ffcccc
| 73
| March 27
| LA Clippers
| 
| Vince Carter (23)
| Samuel Dalembert (11)
| Monta Ellis (7)
| American Airlines Center19,912
| 43–30
|-bgcolor=ccffcc
| 74
| March 29
| Sacramento
| 
| Dirk Nowitzki (19)
| Dirk Nowitzki (7)
| José CalderónDirk Nowitzki(7)
| American Airlines Center20,210
| 44–30

|-bgcolor=ffcccc
| 75
| April 1
| Golden State
| 
| Dirk Nowitzki (33)
| Dirk Nowitzki (11)
| José CalderónMonta Ellis(6)
| American Airlines Center20,423
| 44–31
|-bgcolor=ccffcc
| 76
| April 3
| @ LA Clippers
| 
| Dirk Nowitzki (26)
| Dirk Nowitzki (11)
| Monta Ellis (9)
| Staples Center19,222
| 45–31
|-bgcolor=ccffcc
| 77
| April 4
| @ LA Lakers
| 
| Dirk Nowitzki (27)
| Samuel Dalembert (14)
| Monta Ellis (9)
| Staples Center18,997
| 46–31
|-bgcolor=ccffcc
| 78
| April 6
| @ Sacramento
| 
| Monta Ellis (23)
| Samuel Dalembert (11)
| Devin Harris (7)
| Sleep Train Arena17,023
| 47–31
|-bgcolor=ccffcc
| 79
| April 8
| @ Utah
| 
| Dirk Nowitzki (21)
| three players (6)
| Devin Harris (6)
| EnergySolutions Arena18,102
| 48–31
|-bgcolor=ffcccc
| 80
| April 10
| San Antonio
| 
| Monta Ellis (24)
| Samuel Dalembert (11)
| Monta EllisDevin Harris(4)
| American Airlines Center20,324
| 48–32 
|-bgcolor=ccffcc
| 81
| April 12
| Phoenix
| 
| Monta Ellis (37)
| Brandan Wright (11)
| Devin Harris (6)
| American Airlines Center20,413
| 49–32
|-bgcolor=ffcccc
| 82
| April 16
| @ Memphis
| 
| Dirk Nowitzki (30)
| DeJuan Blair (7)
| Devin Harris (10)
| FedExForum17,323
| 49–33

Playoffs

Game log

|-bgcolor=ffcccc
| 1
| April 20
| @ San Antonio
| 
| Devin Harris (19)
| Samuel DalembertDirk Nowitzki(8)
| Devin Harris (5)
| AT&T Center18,581
| 0–1
|-bgcolor=ccffcc
| 2
| April 23
| @ San Antonio
| 
| Monta Ellis (21)
| DeJuan BlairSamuel Dalembert(7)
| José CalderónDevin Harris(5)
| AT&T Center18,581
| 1–1
|-bgcolor=ccffcc
| 3
| April 26
| San Antonio
| 
| Monta Ellis (29)
| Samuel Dalembert (10)
| José Calderón (9)
| American Airlines Center20,636
| 2–1
|-bgcolor=ffcccc
| 4
| April 28
| San Antonio
| 
| Monta Ellis (20)
| Samuel Dalembert (15)
| Vince Carter (5)
| American Airlines Center20,796
| 2–2
|-bgcolor=ffcccc
| 5
| April 30
| @ San Antonio
| 
| Vince Carter (28)
| Dirk Nowitzki (15)
| Monta Ellis (6)
| AT&T Center18,581
| 2–3
|-bgcolor=ccffcc
| 6
| May 2
| San Antonio
| 
| Monta Ellis (29)
| DeJuan Blair (14)
| José Calderón (6)
| American Airlines Center20,799
| 3–3
|-bgcolor=ffcccc
| 7
| May 4
| @ San Antonio
| 
| Dirk Nowitzki (22)
| Dirk Nowitzki (9)
| José CalderónVince Carter(4)
| AT&T Center18,581
| 3–4

Player statistics
Final statistics.

Regular season

|-
| 
| 78 || 13 || 15.6 || .534 || .000 || .636 || 4.7 || .9 || .8 || .3 || 6.4
|-
| 
| 81 || 81 || 30.5 || .456 || style=background:#0B60AD;color:white;|.449 || .825 || 2.4 || 4.7 || .9 || .1 || 11.4
|-
| 
| 81 || 0 || 24.4 || .407 || .394 || .821 || 3.5 || 2.6 || .8 || .4 || 11.9
|-
| 
| 78 || 8 || 16.1 || .439 || .331 || .754 || 2.5 || .8 || .8 || .3 || 4.6
|-
| 
| 80  || 68 || 20.2 || .568 || .000 || .737 || style=background:#0B60AD;color:white;|6.8 || .5 || .5 || style=background:#0B60AD;color:white;|1.2 || 6.6
|-
| 
| 45 || 1 || 8.7 || .437 || .424 || .909 || 1.0 || .4 || .4 || .0 || 3.2
|-
| 
| style=background:#0B60AD;color:white;|82 || style=background:#0B60AD;color:white;|82 || style=background:#0B60AD;color:white;|36.9 || .451 || .330 || .788 || 3.6 || style=background:#0B60AD;color:white;|5.7 || style=background:#0B60AD;color:white;|1.7 || .3 || 19.0
|-
| 
| 40 || 0 || 20.5 || .378 || .307 || .800 || 2.1 || 4.5 || .7 || .1 || 7.9
|-
| 
| 30 || 0 || 4.9 || .478 || .000 || .545 || 1.4 || .1 || .1 || .3 || .9
|-
| 
| 48 || 0 || 10.2 || .380 || .316 || .640 || .9 || 1.5 || .5 || .0 || 2.8
|-
| 
| 11 || 0 || 3.0 || .353 || .375 || style=background:#0B60AD;color:white;|1.000 || .2 || .2 || .1 || .0 || 1.7
|-
| 
| 76 || 76|| 31.7 || .482 || .358 || .785 || 6.5 || 1.6 || 1.2 || .5 || 10.4
|-
| 
| 31 || 1 || 9.4 || .349 || .250 || .667 || .9 || 2.0 || .1 || .0 || 2.4
|-
| 
| 80 || 80 || 32.9 || .497 || .398 || .899 || 6.2 || 2.7 || .9 || .6 || style=background:#0B60AD;color:white;|21.7
|-
| 
| 58 || 0 || 18.6 || style=background:#0B60AD;color:white;|.677 || .000 || .726 || 4.2 || .5 || .6 || .9 || 9.1
|}

Playoffs

|-
| 
| 6 || 0 || 13.5 || .593 || .000 || .615 || 6.2 || .2 || style=background:#0B60AD;color:white;|2.0 || .0 || 6.7
|-
| 
| 7 || 7 || 27.3 || .462 || .478 || 1.000 || 1.3 || style=background:#0B60AD;color:white;|4.4 || .1 || .0 || 10.3
|-
| 
| 7 || 0 || 27.1 || .456 || style=background:#0B60AD;color:white;|.484 || .786 || 3.6 || 2.4 || .4 || .3 || 12.6
|-
| 
| 7 || 0 || 11.6 || .444 || .429 || .000 || 1.7 || .3 || .3 || .1 || 2.7
|-
| 
| 7 || 7 || 19.3 || .458 || .000 || .667 || style=background:#0B60AD;color:white;|8.4 || .0 || .3 || style=background:#0B60AD;color:white;|1.4 || 4.6
|-
| 
| 2 || 0 || 7.0 || .333 || .333 || 1.000 || 1.0 || 1.0 || .0 || .0 || 4.0
|-
| 
| 7 || 7 || 35.6 || .409 || .353 || .871 || 2.4 || 2.9 || 1.3 || .1 || style=background:#0B60AD;color:white;|20.4
|-
| 
| 7 || 0 || 25.1 || .470 || .440 || .875 || 2.4 || 3.9 || .3 || .3 || 11.4
|-
| 
| 2 || 0 || 4.0 || .000 || .000 || .000 || .5 || .0 || .5 || .0 || 0.0
|-
| 
| 2 || 0 || 5.0 || .000 || .000 || .000 || .5 || 1.0 || .0 || .0 || 0.0
|-
| 
| 7 || 7 || 27.6 || .407 || .222 || .636 || 5.3 || 1.9 || .9 || .1 || 8.4
|-
| 
| 7 || 7 || style=background:#0B60AD;color:white;|37.6 || .429 || .083 || .806 || 8.0 || 1.6 || .9 || .9 || 19.1
|-
| 
| 6 || 0 || 15.0 || style=background:#0B60AD;color:white;|.833 || .000 || .500 || 2.0 || 1.3 || .3 || 1.0 || 5.5
|}

Transactions

Trades

Free agents

Additions

Subtractions

References

Dallas Mavericks seasons
Dallas
Dallas
Dallas
2010s in Dallas
2013 in Texas
2014 in Texas